Bamford is a village in the Peak District, Derbyshire, England, close to the River Derwent. To the north-east is Bamford Edge, and to the north-west the Ladybower, Derwent and Howden Reservoirs. At the 2011 census, it had a population of 1,241.

History
Its name is recorded in the Domesday Book as Banford, and likely came from Anglo-Saxon Bēamford = "tree-trunk ford".

The parish church of St John the Baptist was built c. 1860. There is also the Bamford Methodist Church and Catholic churches in the village, most notable of which is Our Lady of Sorrows Church.

The village graveyard also contains some re-interred graves from the nearby villages of Derwent and Ashopton which were submerged following the creation of Ladybower Reservoir.

Bamford watermill has been turned into flats but some of the original machinery still remains.

Recreation
The village has a sculpture trail and, in mid-July, there is a well dressing festival. Bamford has four public houses, the Derwent Hotel (now a self-catering venue), the Anglers Rest, the Ladybower Inn and the Yorkshire Bridge Inn, the latter once home to former Blue Peter presenter Peter Purves. The village also had a weekly Youth Club held in the Memorial Hall until September 2010.

In October 2013 The Anglers Rest was jointly purchased from the pub chain owners Admiral Taverns by over 300 people from the local area as Derbyshire's first community-owned pub. The Bamford Community Society raised the money needed to buy the Angler's, which will be run as a community hub, listed as an Asset of Community Value under the Government's Localism Act, which also offers a daytime café and houses the local post office.

Nearby Hope Valley College offers Yoga classes at Bamford Village Institute as part of its adult education programme.

Carnival

Until recently, Bamford hosted a village carnival, normally on the third week of July. The carnival took place throughout the week, with the Committee arranging various events for each day, including the whole family. The carnival was centred on the well dressing.
The blessing of the well took place on the Sunday and was followed by the crowning of the Queen, Princess and Rosebud in the church. The following Wednesday hosts the Senior fell race which many runners attend, including running groups from Yorkshire. Other events included the junior fell race, teen group challenge, car treasure hunt, pet show, village history fair and pub quiz.
The Saturday hosted the actual carnival day. The procession travelled from "the old road" and paraded through the village, ending at the recreation ground, where games and entertainment for the whole family were arranged. 
The carnival parade encouraged children to dress up and floats to be made, fitting with the theme of the year. Two bands took part in the procession: Castleton Brass Band was invited every year, along with a visiting band randomly selected each year. There is also a tradition of making a scarecrow and dressing it up and leaving it in your front garden to be admired during the carnival.

Transport
The village is served by Bamford railway station on the Hope Valley line and by regular bus service 257 to Sheffield and Bakewell.

Bamford is known as the Gateway to the Hope Valley from Manchester and the north-west as it provides the only road through to the Hope Valley from the A57 Glossop–Sheffield road over the Snake Pass.

Bamford Mill

As for so many Peak District villages, it developed around its mill, which existed here before the Industrial Revolution. From 1782, a water powered corn mill was built here by a local farmer and miller, Christopher Kirk. This only lasted a few years until destroyed by fire in 1791. It was rebuilt as a cotton mill, still powered by water. In the early 19th century it converted to steam power, with a  beam engine. A more modern horizontal cross-compound mill engine with a rope drive, Edna, by Musgrave was installed in 1907, and remains on site today. Until 1951 the mill also maintained its own gasworks. More electricity generating capacity was provided by a DC generator driven by a De Laval impulse turbine and reduction gearbox, built by Greenwood & Batley.

In 1857, the mill was owned by S. M. Moore and Son and employed 230 mill hands. It was sold in 1885 to Hamilton Cash of Mansfield, then in 1902 to the Fine Cotton Spinners and Doublers Association. The work at this mill was the doubling of cotton yarn which had already been carded and spun in Lancashire mills. This employed 130 hands. In 1963 FS&D became part of Courtaulds, who closed the mill in 1965. Afterwards the mill building was bought by Carbolite, who manufactured electric kilns and laboratory furnaces.

The mill closed permanently in the 1990s and the building was later converted to flats. The chimney was demolished and the boiler plant and turbines removed. The mill engine was preserved on site and remains there today, but is not operational. Every year locals gather to celebrate the mill and how it brought life to the village.

Surroundings
Further up the valley are the Ladybower, Derwent and Howden dams.

Nearby are the villages of Shatton, Bradwell (well known for its ice cream), Hope, Hathersage (well known for its open air swimming pool), Eyam and Castleton, famous for its Blue John stone. A place of notable significance near Bamford would be Buxton.

The nearest urban centre is Sheffield and is a very popular place to visit for the youth of Bamford and well as Chesterfield which is where many students go for higher education.

Film of Bamford in 1945 is held by the Cinema Museum in London. Ref HM0365

See also
Listed buildings in Bamford

References

External links

 Bamford webpage
 Parish Council website

Villages in Derbyshire
Towns and villages of the Peak District
High Peak, Derbyshire